Denis Charles Joseph O'Conor, O'Conor Don (26 October 1869 – 22 February 1917) was an Irish lawyer and hereditary Chief of the Name O'Conor.

O'Conor was the son of Charles Owen O'Conor and Georgina Mary Perry. He was educated at Downside School and the University of London, graduating in law. He was called to the bar at King's Inn. In 1898 he served as High Sheriff of Roscommon, and in 1906 he was appointed Lord Lieutenant of Roscommon in succession to his father. He was a Justice of the Peace for County Roscommon and was admitted to the Privy Council of Ireland in 1916.

References

1869 births
1917 deaths
19th-century Irish people
20th-century Irish people
Alumni of the University of London
High Sheriffs of Roscommon
Irish barristers
Irish chiefs of the name
Irish justices of the peace
Lord-Lieutenants of Roscommon
Members of the Privy Council of Ireland
O'Conor dynasty
People educated at Downside School